Eastern Persian or Eastern Farsi may refer to:
 Dari language
 Tajik language

See also 
 Western Farsi